Until the discovery of Gnostic works among the hidden cache at Nag Hammadi, few authentic Gnostic works survived. One has been the "Letter to Flora" from a Valentinian teacher, Ptolemy— who is also known from the writings of Irenaeus— to a woman named Flora. The letter itself is only known by its full inclusion in Epiphanius's Panarion, an unsympathetic text which condemns its theology as heretical.

Content
The Letter to Flora relates the Gnostic view of the Law of Moses, a rational explication of the proposition that "the whole Law is divided into three parts; we find in it the legislation of Moses, of the elders, and of God himself". 
"the entire Law contained in the Pentateuch of Moses was not ordained by one legislator - I mean, not by God alone: some commandments are Moses', and some were given by other men....  The first part must be attributed to God alone, and his legislation; the second to Moses - not in the sense that God legislates through him, but in the sense that Moses gave some legislation under the influence of his own ideas; and the third to the elders of the people, who seem to have ordained some commandments of their own at the beginning."

The author of the Letter assumes that the Christian Savior was sent, not to destroy the Law, but to complete it. He divides the Law among three types: the pure legislation of God  embodied in the Decalogue, the mixed legislation "laid down for vengeance" affected by the world-situation of its first hearers (the world being inherently evil to a Gnostic), and
"finally, there is the allegorical (exemplary) part, ordained in the image of the spiritual and transcendent matters, I mean the part dealing with offerings and circumcision and the sabbath and fasting and Passover and unleavened bread and other similar matters."

Though making points of a decidedly dualistic nature, Ptolemy supports his readings from "sayings" texts or logia: "We shall draw the proofs of what we say from the words of the Savior, which alone can lead us without error to the comprehension of reality." He quotes sayings of Jesus that can also be found in the gospels of Matthew and of John, and he quotes Paul.

Ptolemy states in the letter that, "this division of the law (that is, god's own law) was established neither by the perfect god, as we have taught, nor surely by the devil -which it would be wrong to say- then the establisher of this division is distinct from them. And he is the craftsman and maker of this universe or world and the things within it." This excerpt reflects Ptolemy's gnostic view that the god that created the world is not the Perfect God, but rather an inferior god who incorrectly believed that he was the one true God, which is what he is trying to convey to Flora.

Literary form
Such a publicly circulated Epistle may have been a literary form, rather than an actual missive sent by a "Ptolemy" to a "Flora.” The Letter was the classical equivalent of the Renaissance and modern Essay format. The attack on Ptolemy by Irenaeus does not eliminate the possibility that the present letter ascribed to him was composed by Epiphanius, in the manner of composed speeches that ancient historians put into the mouths of their protagonists, as a succinct way to sum up the Gnostic views he was intent on demolishing.

References

Bentley Layton, The Gnostic Scriptures

External links
Letter to Flora: e-text (in English)

2nd-century Christian texts
Gnosticism
Greek literature (post-classical)
Letters (message)